Alberto D'Ascola (born 4 July 1977), better known by his stage name Alborosie, is an Italian reggae artist. He is sometimes called the "Italian Reggae Ambassador".

Music career

Early life (2001–2005)
Born Alberto d’Ascola and raised in Marsala, Sicily, Italy, but now residing in Kingston, Jamaica, he is a multi-instrumentalist, being proficient in guitar, bass, drums and keyboard. His musical career began in the Italian reggae band , from Bergamo city, when he was 15 years old in 1993, in which he was known as Stena.

In 2001, Alborosie decided to try a solo career. He moved to Jamaica to be close to reggae music's roots and Rastafari culture. There, he started working as a sound engineer and producer. He has also worked with artists like Gentleman and Ky-Mani Marley. His first solo album was called Soul Pirate. In the summer of 2009, he released his second album which was called Escape from Babylon. In August 2008, Alborosie played at the Uppsala Reggae Festival.

The name "Alborosie" comes from a name he was given in the early years after moving to Jamaica. "Borosie was what they used to call me. Let me put it like this. My early experience in Jamaica was...not nice. Borosie was a name they used to call me and it has a negative meaning. So I said, "I'm gonna use this name and mash up the place, turn a negative into a positive thing!". Basically my name is Albert so I add 'Al', Al-borosie. But I'm not gonna tell you what borosie mean!"

Soul Pirate & Escape From Babylon  (2006–2009)
In 2006, Alborosie released his debut album, Soul Pirate, which included hit singles: "Rastafari Anthem", "Kingston Town", and "Call Up Jah" on his own record label, Forward Recordings. 

He released his second album, Escape From Babylon in 2009 on Greensleeves Records. Through the years he has given concerts all round the world, including most of Europe and Jamaica. He also released a compilation, Escape from Babylon to the Kingdom of Zion on Greensleeves Records in 2010.

Dub Clash, 2 Times Revolution, & Sound The System (2010–2013)
After releasing his first Dub music album, Dub Clash in 2010 and his third album, 2 Times Revolution, Alborosie became the first white artist to win the M.O.B.O. (Music of Black Origin) Awards in the Best Reggae Act category for 2011.

Alborosie released his fourth album, Sound The System on Greensleeves Records in 2013. He followed it up with a dub music version with, Dub the System in 2013 on Greensleeves Records.

He released Sound the System Showcase in 2014, a compilation album.

Collaborations & Re-masters (2014–2015)
Alborosie released a dub album he collaborated with King Jammy called, Dub of Thrones – With King Jammy in 2013 on VP Records.

In 2014, Greensleeves Records released, Specialist Presents Alborosie & Friends, a collection of collaborations with other reggae artists. The album entered the Billboard Top Reggae Albums chart at #7.

Alborosie collaborated with King Jammy on another dub album, Reality of Dub, which was released in early 2015.

In 2015, his classic debut album Soul Pirate, which was released by Evolution Music Group, was re-mastered and released in Deluxe Remastered Edition with 4 never-before-released bonus tracks: "Call Up Jah", "Slambam", "Streets", and "Jamaica".

Freedom & Fyah & The Rockers (2016)
In May 2016, Alborosie's fifth album Freedom & Fyah was released on VP records. In the end of 2016, Evolution Music Group released his classic album Soul Pirate in an acoustic version. The album was released on CD and CD+DVD formats. He also released his sixth studio album, The Rockers on August 24, 2016.

He also released another dub album, Freedom in Dub on VP Records in 2017.

Collaborations with The Wailers and Roots Radics (2016–2019)
His 2018 seventh studio album, Unbreakable: Alborosie Meets The Wailers United peaked at #6 on the Billboard Reggae Albums chart.

Alborosie collaborated with Roots Radics on the 2019 album Alborosie Meets the Roots Radics: Dub for the Radicals.

In The Culture (2021)
On June 4, 2021, Alborosie released his eighth studio album, titled In The Culture. It features fourteen tracks that were written, produced, and performed in the during the COVID-19 pandemic using vintage analogue gear, dub sirens, reel-to-reel tape, and live instrumentation by Alborosie and the Roots Radics band. Special guest performers Alborosie collaborated with were Collie Buddz, Jo Mersa Marley, Quino of Big Mountain, and The Wailing Souls, which Alborosie produced the duo's latest album Back-A-Yard.

In December 2021, Alborosie was nominated for the fans-choice "2021 Album of the Year" award by Surf Roots TV & Radio for their album For The Culture. Voting was determined by Facebook, Instagram and Twitter users. This was the band's first time being nominated with the reggae rock streaming TV channel on Amazon Fire TV, Apple TV, and Roku.

Personal life
Alberto D'Ascola was born on 4 July 1977 in Marsala, Sicily, Italy.

His father is a retired policeman and his mother was a housewife. D'Ascola developed an interest in reggae music and joined the band Reggae National Tickets in 1992 (at the age of 15.) He is a dual citizen of both Italy and Jamaica.

Discography

Solo studio albums

Dub albums

Re-edition albums

With Reggae National Tickets
Squali (1996)
Un affare difficile (1997)
Lascia un po' di te (1998)
La Isla (1999)
Roof Club (2000)

Produced by Alborosie
Alborosie presents His Majesty Riddim (2016), VP

Awards and nominations

References

External links

Official website
Official Facebook page
BBC Music profile
Discography at Discogs

Living people
1977 births
People from Marsala
Jamaican reggae musicians
Italian emigrants to Jamaica
Jamaican Rastafarians
Italian Rastafarians
Converts to the Rastafari movement
Jamaican people of Italian descent
21st-century Italian male singers
VP Records artists
Greensleeves Records artists